Dui Prithibi is a 1980 classic Bengali movie directed by Piyush Bose. It stars Uttam Kumar, Ranjit Mallick, Victor Banerjee and 
Prosenjit Chatterjee. Ananda Shankar scored the music of the movie. Film is produced under the banner of Uttam's own foundation Shilpi Sangshad and this is the second film produced by Shilpi Sangshad.

Plot
Mrinal Dutta, the elder son of the family, is a reporter and the sole earning member. He has a sister whose marriage is almost fixed with their music teacher. The climax starts building up when brother Kunal Dutta returns a rich businessman. He spends money lavishly and becomes the most powerful person in the family with a house and a car. The sister's marriage is suddenly called off and a new alliance is sought after with the principal of a music school. The monetary differences between the two brothers start stemming up in various forms. Kunal unexpectedly marries a girl whose father was a freedom fighter. Kunal, however is very rude to his wife and one day she finds some evidence of Kunal being involved in smuggling. Kunal is eventually proved a smuggler. This leads to more problems in the family and sibling relationships are on doldrums. The sister's fiancé takes advantage of her and impregnates her. During this time the police chase Kunal who comes begging for help from his brother. The police however arrest him and put him behind bars. After that the family pleads guilty. Kunal is punished for a term of 4 years. The sister's fiancé takes responsibility of his insensitive act and all is fine with the family after a brief period of turmoil.

Cast
Uttam Kumar as Mrinal Dutta
Ranjit Mallick as
Kalyani Mondal
Victor Banerjee as Kunal Dutta
Supriya Chowdhury
Prasenjit Chatterjee as Young Mrinal
Tanushree Shankar

Production
This is the second film after the blockbuster Bon Polashir Padabali in 1973 produced by Uttam Kumar's foundation Shilpi Sangshad to help again to poor artists and technicians and just like that the all the top artists worked without any fees. The film was based on the novel Seet Gishwe Onek Ritu by Sounik Gupta. Music was gave by the famous composer Ananda Shankar. The film was directed and screenplayed by Pijush Bose with whom Uttam Kumar worked before memorable and hit films such as Sanyashi Raja, Bagh Bondi Khela in 1975, Banhisikha in 1976,  Sabyasachi in 1977 Dhanraj Tamang in 1978 and Brajabuli in 1980. In the film the famous actor Prosenjit Chatterjee played Uttam's young aged role.

Soundtrack

References

External links
 

1980 films
1980 drama films
Bengali-language Indian films
Indian drama films
1980s Bengali-language films